Okanagan Challenge is a Canadian soccer team based in Kelowna, British Columbia, Canada. Founded in 1995, the team plays in Pacific Coast Soccer League (PCSL), a national amateur league at the fourth tier of the American Soccer Pyramid, which features teams from western Canada and the Pacific Northwest region of the United States of America.

The team plays its home matches in the Apple Bowl at the Parkinson Recreation Area, where they have played since 1995. The team's colours are red, black and white.

History
The club was founded in 1989 as a registered not-for-profit society with the aim of providing a level of senior soccer not previously available in Kelowna.

The team competes in the Pacific Coast Soccer League which is, arguably, the top echelon of amateur soccer in Western Canada. In the club’s first twenty years we are proud of several achievements – finalists in the 1995 play-offs, league champions and play-off winners in 1997 and 1998, finalists 2004 play-offs and semi-finalists in 2005. In its twentieth year the Challenge won the regular 2009 PCSL season title, the post-season title and the John F. Kennedy Cup. The Kennedy Cup is a tournament between the best British Columbia, Oregon and Washington State men's teams. In 1998 the Challenge was chosen as Kelowna’s Athletic Team of the Year, and runner-up in 2010 at the Kelowna Civic Awards.

The club has been involved in summer soccer camps for many hundreds of youth players almost every year since 1992.

Well-known players and coaches of the team have included Ian Bridge, Shaun Lowther, Pat Onstad and Rob Friend, who have all been Canadian National Soccer Team members.

The team usually comprises ten to fifteen local, talented players augmented by four to seven players from out of town.

Year-by-year

Honors
'''Sheila Anderson Memorial (Challenge) Cup Winners 2011
John F. Kennedy Trophy (Kennedy Cup) Winners 2009
Sheila Anderson Memorial (Challenge) Cup Winners 2009
PCSL Champions 2009
PCSL Champions 1998
PCSL Champions 1997
Sheila Anderson Memorial (Challenge) Cup Winners 1998
Sheila Anderson Memorial (Challenge) Cup Winners 1997

Head coach
  Kelly Wolverton

Stadiums
 Apple Bowl; Kelowna, British Columbia (1995–2012)

Average attendance

External links
 

Soccer clubs in British Columbia
Sport in Kelowna
Pacific Coast Soccer League teams
Association football clubs established in 1995
1995 establishments in British Columbia